Saúl Gustavo Lisazo Oscoidi (born June 1, 1956 in Los Toldos, province of Buenos Aires in Argentina) is an Argentine actor and ex-footballer.

Biography
Saúl Gustavo Lisazo Oscoidi is one of 6 siblings: Maria, Fernanda, Araceli, Alejandro, Mauricio, and Vanina.  One event in his childhood that marked him was the death of his father when he only was 12 years old. Soccer is one of his passions; he started playing soccer with his father when he was a little boy and it grew to be his favorite sport and one that would take him to other countries around the world.  In Spain, he met who would become the woman of his life, former model Mónica Viedma, whom he married. The pair has two kids, Paula, who was born on June 4, 1999 and Martin, born on November 11, 2003.

He played in Sarmiento for 10 years. He also played in Atlanta in Argentina, KSK Beveren and KV Mechelen in Belgium; and in Juventus from Brazil.  Saúl had to leave the sport but he tried to play in Barcelona until an injury in his knee forced him to leave it completely.  In 1983, he decided to become a model.

In 1988, he started studying dramatic arts in Spain, at the academy of the Argentine actress Cristina Rotta.  After two and a half years of preparation he had his first opportunity, in the movie "El Regreso a la Isla del Tesoro".  During the early 1990s, Saúl flew to Mexico City, where he was the image of a very important liquor company which brought him international fame.  Meanwhile, he acted in theater shows like "La Fierecilla Domada", "Tartufo," and others.

His first telenovela break came in 1990, when Mexican actress Lucía Méndez insisted that he be her partner in her new novela, "Amor de Nadie", which became a major hit across Latin America.  After that he started in other telenovelas, such as "Acapulco, Cuerpo y Alma", and "La Jaula de Oro", among others.  He also was in productions such as Tenias que ser Tu, Prisionera de Amor.

Filmography

Films

Television

References

External links
 Telemundo Website
 Official "Tierra de Pasiones" Website
 

1956 births
Living people
Argentine male telenovela actors
Argentine people of Basque descent
Argentine emigrants to Mexico
Naturalized citizens of Mexico